{{DISPLAYTITLE:C13H14N2O}}
The molecular formula C13H14N2O (molar mass: 214.26 g/mol, exact mass: 214.1106 u) may refer to:

 Fenyramidol, or phenyramidol
 Harmaline